Zachary Kobayashi (born August 20, 1997) is an American soccer player.

Career
On April 20, 2017, Kobayashi joined United Soccer League side Orange County SC from the Dinamo Zagreb academy.

On March 1, 2019, Kobayashi joined USL side Portland Timbers 2.

References

External links

1997 births
Living people
American expatriate soccer players
American soccer players
Association football midfielders
Orange County SC players
People from Rancho Santa Margarita, California
Portland Timbers 2 players
Soccer players from California
Sportspeople from Orange County, California
USL Championship players